The 2014 Big 12 Conference women's basketball tournament was the postseason women's basketball tournament for the Big 12 Conference, held from March 7 to 10 in Oklahoma City at Chesapeake Energy Arena.

The 2014 tournament is already guaranteed to make history as for the first time ever, every game will be televised nationally.

Seeds

Schedule

Tournament

* – Denotes overtime

All-Tournament team
Most Outstanding Player – Nina Davis, Baylor

See also
2014 Big 12 Conference men's basketball tournament
2014 NCAA Women's Division I Basketball Tournament
2013–14 NCAA Division I women's basketball rankings

References

External links
 2014 Phillips 66 Big 12 Conference women's basketball tournament Official Website

Tournament
Big 12 Conference women's basketball tournament
Big 12 Conference women's basketball tournament
Big 12 Conference women's basketball tournament